Burenin, female form Burenina, is a Russian surname. Notable people with this surname include:

 Ivan Burenin (1896–1986), Soviet general
 Nikolay Burenin (1874–1962), Russian revolutionary
 Viktor Burenin (1841–1926), Russian literary and theatre critic